This page lists individuals and organisations who publicly expressed an opinion regarding the 2016 Italian constitutional referendum.

Yes

Members of the government and institutions

Presidents of Italy

 Giorgio Napolitano, 11th President of Italy (Independent)

Presidents of the Senate

 Pietro Grasso, 39th President of the Senate (PD)

 Franco Marini, 37th President of the Senate (PD)
 Marcello Pera, 36th President of the Senate (Independent)

Presidents of the Chamber of Deputies

 Laura Boldrini, 41st President of the Chamber of Deputies (SI)

 Pier Ferdinando Casini, 38th President of the Chamber of Deputies (UdC) 
 Luciano Violante, 37th President of the Chamber of Deputies (PD)

Prime Ministers

 Matteo Renzi, 56th Prime Minister (PD)

 Giuliano Amato, 48th Prime Minister (PD) 
 Enrico Letta, 55th Prime Minister (PD) 
 Romano Prodi, 52nd Prime Minister (Independent)

Ministers

 Angelino Alfano, Minister of the Interior (NCD)
 Maria Elena Boschi, Minister of Constitutional Reform (PD)
 Carlo Calenda, Minister of Economic Development (Independent)
 Enrico Costa, Minister of Regional Affairs and Autonomies (NCD)
 Graziano Delrio, Minister of Infrastructures and Transports (PD)
 Dario Franceschini, Minister of Culture and Tourism (PD)
 Gian Luca Galletti, Minister of Environment (UdC)
 Paolo Gentiloni, Minister of Foreign Affairs (PD)
 Stefania Giannini, Minister of Education, University and Research (PD)
 Beatrice Lorenzin, Minister of Health (NCD)
 Marianna Madia, Minister of Public Administration (PD)
 Maurizio Martina, Minister of Agriculture, Food and Forestry Policies (PD)
 Andrea Orlando, Minister of Justice (PD) 
 Pier Carlo Padoan, Minister of Economy and Finance (Independent)
 Roberta Pinotti, Minister of Defense (PD)
 Giuliano Poletti, Minister of Labour and Social Policies (Independent)

 Fabrizio Barca, Minister for Territorial Cohesion (PD)
 Emma Bonino, Minister of Foreign Affairs (RI) 
 Paolo De Castro, Minister of Agriculture, Food and Forestry Policies (PD)
 Cesare Damiano, Minister of Labour (PD)
 Linda Lanzillotta, Minister for Regional Affairs (PD)
 Maurizio Lupi, Minister of Infrastructures and Transports (NCD)
 Giuseppe Fioroni, Minister of Education (PD)
 Giovanna Melandri, Minister of Youth Policies and Sports (PD)
 Arturo Parisi, Minister of Defense (PD)
 Francesco Rutelli, Minister of Cultural Heritage and Tourism (PD)

Members of local governments

President of Regions

 Stefano Bonaccini, President of Emilia-Romagna (PD)
 Luca Ceriscioli, President of Marche (PD)
 Sergio Chiamparino, President of Piedmont (PD)
 Rosario Crocetta, President of Sicily (PD)
 Vincenzo De Luca, President of Campania (PD)
 Catiuscia Marini, President of Umbria (PD)
 Mario Oliverio, President of Calabria (PD) 
 Francesco Pigliaru, President of Sardinia (PD)
 Augusto Rollandin, President of Aosta Valley (UV)
 Enrico Rossi, President of Tuscany (PD)
 Ugo Rossi, President of Trentino-Alto Adige/Südtirol (PATT)
 Debora Serracchiani, President of Friuli-Venezia Giulia (PD)
 Nicola Zingaretti, President of Lazio (PD)

Mayors of main cities

 Antonio Battista, Mayor of Campobasso (PD) 
 Enzo Bianco, Mayor of Catania (PD) 
 Luigi Brugnaro, Mayor of Venice (Independent) 
 Massimo Cialente, Mayor of L'Aquila (PD) 
 Antonio Decaro, Mayor of Bari (PD) 
 Valeria Mancinelli, Mayor of Ancona (PD) 
 Virginio Merola, Mayor of Bologna (PD) 
 Dario Nardella, Mayor of Florence (PD) 
 Giuseppe Sala, Mayor of Milan (PD) 
 Flavio Tosi, Mayor of Verona (F!) 

 Walter Veltroni, Mayor of Rome (PD)

Members of the Parliament

Members of the Chamber of Deputies

 Peppino Calderisi
 Mariotto Segni (Independent)

Members of the Senate

Members of provincial councils

Former Members of provincial councils

European institutions

Member of the European Parliament

International political figures

Head of states and governments
 Jean-Claude Juncker, President of the European Commission
 Barack Obama, 44th President of the United States
 Angela Merkel, Chancellor of Germany

National ministers and secretaries
 Thomas de Maiziere, Minister of the Interior of Germany 
 Wolfgang Schaeuble, Minister of Finance of Germany

International organisations
 Organisation for Economic Co-operation and Development
 International Monetary Fund

Notable individuals

Businesspersons

 Flavio Briatore, businessman 
 Claudio Descalzi, CEO of Eni
 Sergio Marchionne, CEO of FCA
 Mauro Moretti, CEO of Finmeccanica
 Marco Tronchetti Provera, CEO of Pirelli

Presenters and journalists

 Ilaria D'Amico, commentator and television host
 Gad Lerner, journalist, television presenter and writer 
 Michele Santoro, journalist and television presenter 
 Natasha Stefanenko, model and television presenter

University and academic figures
 Giuseppe Galasso, historian

Constitutional judges and lawyer
 Sabino Cassese, former judge of the Constitutional Court of Italy

University professors and judges letter
On 23 May, replying to the Constitutionalists letter standing for the "No", 193 judges and professors in various universities of Italy signed a letter to support the "Yes". Notable signatories included:

Others
 Stefano Boeri, architect and urban planner 
 Andrea Carandini, historian of arts

Celebrities

Actors and film directors

 Stefano Accorsi, actor 
 Francesca Archibugi, film director 
 Roberto Benigni, actor, comedian, screenwriter and film director 
 Roberto Bolle, dancer 
 Massimo Bottura, chef 
 Liliana Cavani, film director 
 Cristiana Capotondi, actress 
 Cristina Comencini, film director and scriptwriter 
 Ivan Cotroneo, film director and scriptwriter 
 Emma Dante, writer and actress 
 Fabio De Luigi, actor and comedian 
 Pierfrancesco Favino, actor 
 Isabella Ferrari, actress 
 Beppe Fiorello, actor 
 Carla Fracci, actress and ballet dancer 
 Massimo Ghini, actor 
 Simona Izzo, actress and film director 
 Valeria Marini, model and actress 
 Andrea Occhipinti, actor and producer 
 Silvio Orlando, actor 
 Ferzan Özpetek, film director and screenwriter 
 Michele Placido, actor and film director 
 Alessandro Preziosi, actor 
 Gabriele Salvatores, film director and screenwriter 
 Stefania Sandrelli, actress 
 Giulio Scarpati, actor 
 Elena Sofia Ricci, actress 
 Paolo Sorrentino, film director and screenwriter 
 Oliviero Toscani, photographer 
 Ricky Tognazzi, actor and film director 
 Pamela Villoresi, actress 
 Paolo Virzì, film director and screenwriter 
 Luca Zingaretti, actor

Singers and producers

 Piero Barone, singer and member of Il Volo
 Andrea Bocelli, classical tenor 
 Ignazio Boschetto, singer and member of Il Volo
 Caterina Caselli, singer and producer 
 Gianluca Ginoble, singer and member of Il Volo
 Zubin Mehta, Indian conductor of Western classical music

Writers and artists
 Federico Moccia, writer 
 Susanna Tamaro, novelist

Sportspeople

 Gianluigi Buffon, football goalkeeper
 Marco Tardelli, former football player and manager 
 Alex Zanardi, racing driver and paracyclist

Organisations

Committees

Main political parties

Minor parties

European political parties

Trade unions and business organisations

Newspapers

Periodicals

Other organisations

No

Members of the government and institutions

Presidents of the Senate

 Renato Schifani, 38th President of the Senate (FI)

Presidents of the Chamber of Deputies

 Gianfranco Fini, 40th President of the Chamber of Deputies (Independent)

Prime Ministers

 Silvio Berlusconi, 50th Prime Minister (FI) 
 Massimo D'Alema,  53rd Prime Minister (PD) 
 Ciriaco De Mita, 47th Prime Minister (UdC) 
 Lamberto Dini, 51st Prime Minister (Independent) 
 Mario Monti, 54th Prime Minister (Independent)

Ministers

 Pier Luigi Bersani, Minister of Economic Development (PD) 
 Paolo Cirino Pomicino, Minister of Budget (UdC) 
 Antonio Di Pietro, Minister of Infrastructures (IdV) 
 Raffaele Fitto, Minister of Regional Affairs and Autonomies (CR)
 Giovanni Maria Flick, Minister of Justice (DC) 
 Gaetano Quagliariello, Minister of Constitutional Reforms (IDEA)

Members of local governments

Mayors of main cities

 Chiara Appendino, Mayor of Turin (M5S) 
 Dario De Luca, Mayor of Potenza (FdI) 
 Luigi de Magistris, Mayor of Naples (Independent) 
 Roberto Dipiazza, Mayor of Trieste (FI) 
 Marco Doria, Mayor of Genoa (Independent) 
 Clemente Mastella, Mayor of Benevento (FI) 
 Leoluca Orlando, Mayor of Palermo (SI) 
 Virginia Raggi, Mayor of Rome (M5S)

Members of the Parliament

Members of the Chamber of Deputies

 Marco Follini
 Roberto Zaccaria
 Gianfranco Fini

Members of the Senate of the Republic

International figures

Member of the European Parliament

From other European Union member states

 Pablo Bustinduy, Spanish politician and member of Podemos
 Nikolas Chountis, Greek politician and MEP for Popular Unity
 Miguel Urbàn Crespo, Spanish politician and MEP for Podemos
 Íñigo Errejón, Spanish politician, deputy and political Secretary of Podemos
 Nigel Farage, Britain politician, MEP and leader of the UKIP
 Alberto Garzón, Spanish politician and deputy of Izquierda Unida
 Marine Le Pen, French politician, MEP and leader of the Front National
 Paloma Lopez, Spanish politician and MEP for Izquierda Unida
 Dimitrios Papadimoulis, Greek politician and MEP for SYRIZA
 Lola Sanchez, Spanish politician and MEP for Podemos

Notable individuals

Journalists, commentators, and political satirists
 Maurizio Crozza, political satirist 
 Sabina Guzzanti, political satirist 
 Marco Travaglio, journalist

University and academic figures
 Luciano Canfora, philologist 
 Paul Ginsborg, historian 
 Piergiorgio Odifreddi, mathematician and essayist 
 Gianni Vattimo, philosopher

Constitutional judges and lawyer
 Stefano Rodotà, judge 
 Gustavo Zagrebelsky, judge and former President of the Constitutional Court of Italy

Constitutionalists letter
On 22 April, 56 constitutionalists and judges published a letter to criticize the reform. Signed the letter:

Other
 Fernando Aiuti, immunologist 
 Carlo Freccero, former director of Rai 2 and Italia 1
 Salvatore Settis, archaeologist 
 Nicola Tranfaglia, historian

Celebrities

Actors and film directors

 Rossella Brescia, anchorwoman 
 Rosita Celentano, actress and anchorwoman 
 Roberto Faenza, film director 
 Sabrina Ferilli, actress 
 Ficarra e Picone, actors and comedian duo 
 Elio Germano, actor 
 Claudio Gioè, actor 
 Monica Guerritore, actress 
 Leo Gullotta, actor 
 Citto Maselli, film director 
 Giuliano Montaldo, film director and actor 
 Moni Ovadia, actor 
 Alba Parietti, actress and anchorwoman 
 Daniela Poggi, actress and anchorwoman 
 Ottavia Piccolo, actress 
 Claudio Santamaria, film director 
 Toni Servillo, actor

Singers and producers

 Fedez, singer 
 Fiorella Mannoia, singer 
 Giorgia, singer 
 J-Ax, singer 
 Anna Oxa, singer 
 Paolo Rossi, singer and actor 
 Piero Pelù, singer

Writers and artists
 Andrea Camilleri, writer 
 Erri De Luca, writer 
 Rosetta Loy, writer

Organisations

Committees

Main political parties

Minor parties

European political parties

Trade unions and business organisations

Newspapers

Periodicals

Other organisations

Boycott (No)

Minor parties

Neutral

Minor parties

Notes

The IU dissolved before the election.

References

Constitutional referendums in Italy
2016 elections in Italy
Political endorsements